Georgetown is a city in Texas and the county seat of Williamson County, Texas, United States. The population was 67,176 at the 2020 census. It is 30 miles (48 km) north of Austin.

Founded in 1875 from four existing colleges, the oldest of which had been founded 35 years earlier, Southwestern University is the oldest university in Texas. It is in Georgetown about one-half mile from the historic square.

Georgetown has a notable range of Victorian commercial and residential architecture. In 1976, a local historic ordinance was passed to recognize and protect the significance of the historic central business district. In 1977, the Williamson County Courthouse Historical District, containing some 46 contributing structures, was listed on the National Register of Historic Places. Georgetown is also known as the "Red Poppy" Capital of Texas for the red poppy (Papaver rhoeas) wildflowers planted throughout the city. Georgetown's Red Poppy Festival, which attracts tens of thousands of visitors annually, is held in April each year on the historic square.

History

Prehistoric era

Georgetown has been the site of human habitation since at least 9,000 B.C., and possibly considerably before that. The earliest-known inhabitants of the county, during the late Pleistocene (Ice Age), can be linked to the Clovis culture, a Paleo-Indian culture characterized by the manufacture of distinctive "Clovis points" for weapons. It first appeared around 9200 B.C., and possibly as early as 11,500 B.C., at the end of the last glacial period.

One of the most important discoveries in recent times is that of the ancient skeletal remains dubbed the "Leanderthal Lady", because of its age and proximity to a nearby community Leander, Texas. The site is immediately southwest of Georgetown and was discovered by accident by Texas Department of Transportation workers while core samples for a new highway were being drilled. The site has been extensively studied for many years, and samples carbon date the findings to the Pleistocene period, about 10,500 years ago (8500 B.C.). Archeological dig sites showing much greater evidence of Archaic period inhabitants have been found in burned rock middens at several sites along the San Gabriel River, which have since been inundated by the manmade Granger Lake, and at the confluence of the North and South San Gabriel rivers in Georgetown.

Early history
The earliest known historical occupants of the county, the Tonkawa, were a flint-working, hunting people who followed buffalo on foot and periodically set fire to the prairie to aid them in their hunts. During the 18th century, they made the transition to a horse culture and used firearms to a limited extent. Also, small numbers of Kiowa, Yojuane, Tawakoni, and Mayeye Indians apparently were living in the county at the time of the earliest Anglo settlements. As these native populations thinned under pressure from non-indigenous settlements, the Comanche continued to raid native peoples' settlements in the county until the 1860s.

Modern history
Georgetown was named for George Washington Glasscock, who donated the land for the new town. Early American and Swedish pioneers were attracted to the area's abundance of timber and good, clear water. In addition, the land was inexpensive and fertile. Georgetown is the county seat of Williamson County, which was formed on March 13, 1848, after the early settlers petitioned the state legislature to create it from a portion of Milam County. The county was originally to have been named San Gabriel County, but was instead named after Robert McAlpin Williamson (known as "Three-legged Willie"), a Texas statesman and judge at the time.

Georgetown was an agrarian community for most of the 19th and early 20th centuries. The Shawnee Trail, a cattle trail that led from Texas to the rail centers in Kansas and Missouri, crossed through Georgetown. The establishment of Southwestern University in 1873 and construction of a railroad in 1878 contributed to the town's growth and importance. A stable economy developed, based largely on agricultural activity. Cotton was the dominant crop in the area between the 1880s and the 1920s. In this period, Williamson County was once the top producer of cotton in Texas.

At one time, Georgetown was served by two national railroads, the International-Great Northern Railroad, which eventually was merged into the Missouri Pacific, and the Missouri–Kansas–Texas Railroad. Both supported the transport of commodities to market: beef cattle and cotton. The regional Georgetown and Granger Railroad (GGR) was completed to Austin in 1904. Georgetown is served today by the Georgetown Railroad, a 'short line' railroad that uses portions of the former M-K-T and the I-GN to connect with the Union Pacific Railroad at Round Rock and at Granger.

Georgetown was home to minor league baseball. The 1914 Georgetown Collegians began play as charter members of the Class D level Middle Texas League.

In 1921 a low-pressure system from a hurricane settled in over Williamson County and brought more than 23 inches of rain in Taylor and more than 18 inches of rain in Georgetown. The flooding resulted in the deaths of 156 persons, many of them farm laborers. There was also extensive property damage, and Georgetown residents sought to begin flood control.

The U.S. Army Corps of Engineers completed construction of a dam more than 50 years later, on the north fork of the San Gabriel River, to create and impound Lake Georgetown, which opened officially on October 5, 1979. Both Georgetown and Round Rock own water rights to Lake Georgetown for municipal water use.

Population growth and industrial expansion continued modestly in the 20th century until about 1960, when residential, commercial, and industrial development, due to major growth and urban expansion of nearby Austin, greatly accelerated. In 2008, Fortune Small Business magazine ranked Georgetown as the second-best city in the nation to "live and launch" a new business.

In March 2015, Georgetown announced that their municipal-owned utility, Georgetown Utility Systems, would begin buying 100% of power for its customers from wind and solar farms by 2017, effectively making the city 100% green-powered.

Burkland-Frisk House

A densely overgrown, 1908–1910 Victorian house was found in Round Rock, Texas. (The site was later redeveloped for the La Frontera project.)  The historic house was cut into pieces, and moved to Georgetown in 2006. There it was restored by Don Martin and Bill Smalling (1953–2008). It is located on San Gabriel Village Blvd, prominently overlooking the South San Gabriel River, and is now used as an office. It is known locally as the Burkland-Frisk House, as it was built by Leonard Frisk, an early settler in Williamson County, and was later owned by Tony Burkland, a relative.

In Round Rock, this house was originally across the street from an identical house, built in the same era. The latter was used in the filming of The Texas Chain Saw Massacre. The houses were known as "pattern book" houses, ordered from a catalog and assembled on site from a package of materials brought by wagon from a local lumber company. They were likely built between 1908 and 1910. Later the filmed house was cut and relocated to Kingsland, Texas. There it was redeveloped as part of the Antlers Hotel.

Historic neighborhoods
In the 1970s, Georgetown's downtown was bleak and featureless. In an effort to modernize and compete with suburban retail development, building owners in the 1950s and 1960s had obscured some of their historical retail buildings. The Texas-Victorian streetscape was plastered with stucco, aluminum covers, brick, and multiple layers of white paint. Community leaders began to reassess this retail stock, and work with the Main Street program of the National Trust for Historic Preservation to enhance the architectural heritage of the city.

In this period, economics also began to favor the reuse of historic buildings, as the cost of borrowing money was soaring. In Georgetown, every bank offered significantly lower interest loans for the renewal of the town's grand Victorian buildings and facades. Rehabilitation tax credit programs in the 1980s made investing in historic property more profitable. By 1984, 40 rehabilitations were complete. Two years after Georgetown initiated its Main Street program, more than half the Main Street district had undergone some kind of positive transition.

The city was recently named one of the best places to purchase a historic house. Today, Georgetown is home to one of the best-preserved Victorian and pre-WW1 downtown historic districts, with the Beaux-Arts Williamson County Courthouse (1911) as its centerpiece. Due to its successful preservation efforts, Georgetown was named a national Main Street City in 1997, the first Texas city so designated. Georgetown has three National Register Historic Districts:
 Williamson County Courthouse Historic District
 Belford National District
 The University Avenue/Elm Street District

Geography

Georgetown is located at  (30.651187, −97.681333), 26 miles (42 km) north of Austin's central business district. According to the United States Census Bureau, the city has a total area of 24.9 square miles (64.6 km2), of which 22.8 square miles (59.1 km2) are land and 2.1 square miles (5.4 km2) (8.42%) are covered by water.

The city is located on the northeastern edge of Texas Hill Country. Portions of Georgetown are located on either side of the Balcones Escarpment, a fault line in which the areas roughly east of IH-35 are flat and characterized by having black, fertile soils of the Blackland Prairie, and the west side of the escarpment which consists mostly of hilly, karst-like terrain with little topsoil and higher elevations and which is part of the Texas Hill Country. Inner Space Cavern, a large cave, is a major tourist attraction found on the south side of the city, just west of Interstate 35, and is a large-scale example of limestone karst formations.

The North and Middle Forks of the San Gabriel River both run through the city. More than 30 miles of hike and bike trails, several parks, and recreation for both residents and visitors are provided along their banks.

Major highways
 Interstate 35
 State Highway 29
 State Highway 195
 State Highway 130 (Toll Road)

Endangered species
Georgetown is home to five endangered species. Two are songbirds protected by the Balcones Canyonlands Preserve in Travis and Williamson Counties. Invertebrate species found only in Williamson County live in the cave-like fissures on the west side of Georgetown. Karst topography is the name for the honeycomb-type limestone formations (including caves, sinkholes, and fissures) that are typical in the county's limestone geology west of I-35.

In the 1990s, a small group of concerned landowners and developers formed the Northern Edwards Aquifer Resource Council. Their goal was to identify and preserve a sufficient number of caves with endangered species to ensure survival of the species. Ultimately they wanted to obtain a United States Fish and Wildlife Service 10-A permit (known as an Incidental Take Permit) for the entire county by such actions. By gaining the permit, these species would be preserved through voluntary donations of land rather than by the county or state requiring setbacks and other involuntary means. The group documented their successful work in an environmental impact statement to the county in 2002, and a county-wide 10-A permit was obtained in October 2008.

Climate
According to the Köppen climate classification system, Georgetown has a humid subtropical climate, Cfa on climate maps.

Georgetown, like much of Central Texas, is characterized by its long, hot summers and cooler, mild winters. The average summer temperature typically reaches 100 °F for several days during July and August. It is common for highs to be near 90 °F well into October, but by this time, the nights are noticeably cooler.

Winters in Georgetown have highs in the 50s and 60s, with a few days dropping near freezing, causing one or two ice storms per season. A few days reach well above the average. The region may have temperatures in the 80s well into December and 70s in January.

Fall, winter, and spring all average about two to three inches of rain per month, while July and August are the driest, averaging only one to two inches and sometimes no precipitation at all. Most of what rain does fall during the long summer comes from the outflow of Gulf storms that are often pushed away from the region by a large summer high-pressure system.

Georgetown has more than 225 days classified as mostly sunny to sunny, among a total of more than 300 days of at least partly cloudy skies per year.

Demographics

2020 census

As of the 2020 United States census, there were 67,176 people, 28,075 households, and 19,180 families residing in the city. The population density was 1,241.3 people per square mile (479.3/km2). The 10,902 housing units averaged 477.5 per square mile (184.4/km2). Of the 28,075 households, 31.8% had children under the age of 18 living with them, 61.6% were married couples living together, 9.5% had a female householder with no husband present, and 25.8% were not families; 21.5% of all households were made up of individuals, and 9.3% had someone living alone who was 65 years of age or older. The average household size was 2.52 and the average family size was 2.92.

In the city, the population was distributed as 23.4% under the age of 18, 11.4% from 18 to 24, 26.3% from 25 to 44, 21.3% from 45 to 64, and 17.7% who were 65 years of age or older. The median age was 37 years. For every 100 females, there were 95.0 males. For every 100 women age 18 and over, there were 91.1 men.

The median income for a household in the city was $54,098, and for a family was $63,338. Males had a median income of $40,541 versus $27,082 for females. The per capita income for the city was $24,287. About 4.4% of families and 7.2% of the population were below the poverty line, including 9.3% of those under age 18 and 3.9% of those age 65 or over.

Economy

List of major employers
Georgetown's major employers and number of employees as of June 2009:
 Williamson County Government (1,700)
 Georgetown Independent School District (1,650)
 St. David's Georgetown Hospital (650)
 Airborn, Inc. (550)
 City of Georgetown (455)
 Southwestern University (450)
 Caring Home Health (400)
 Wesleyan Homes, Inc. (290)
 Sun City (Del Webb) (260)

Interstate Highway 35 location

Without question, the single most important issue relating to economic development was the location of Interstate 35 through Georgetown. Originally, when first conceived, a Georgetown route was very much in doubt, as most alignments had the road going through or near Taylor. At the time, Taylor was the economic hub of Williamson County as the center for cotton and cattle. While the Taylor leadership supported the Taylor route, local farmers opposed it. The interstate required then-unheard-of 300 feet of right of way across the entire county and through nearby Taylor farms, and many farmers worried that their homes might get cut off from their fields. Also, concerns were expressed about noise relating to cattle and other farm animals. Meanwhile, Round Rock and Georgetown leadership strongly lobbied for a route along the Balcones Escarpment fault line, which would later become U.S. Highway 81 and then eventually I-35.

Sun City

The second-largest economic development activity in Georgetown history was the selection in 1995 of Georgetown as the site for the first-ever Sun City location in Texas. Originally called Sun City Georgetown, the project today is called Sun City Texas due to its size and because it draws residents from all over the state. , about 15,700 people live in the massive, 4,700-acre (and expanding) community, with an average net worth over $1,000,000 per person. The economic stimulus, creation of sales tax, banking and investment, and the high rate of community support and volunteerism has had an enormous effect on Georgetown.

Opened in June 1995, Sun City Texas is a 5,300-acre (21 km2) age-restricted community located in Georgetown, about 10 miles west of I-35 on Williams Drive (RM 2338). It is part of the chain of Sun City communities started by the Del E. Webb Construction Company (now a division of PulteGroup). Residency is restricted to persons over age 55 (at least one person in a couple has to be 55 or older). Sun City Texas is made up mostly of single-family dwellings, but also has duplexes. It is legal to drive golf carts on the streets in the development (under a special Texas license exemption with help from Del Webb), and most shopping and the community facilities all have special parking slots for them.

Opposition to the project has been vocal at times, especially at the start during the zoning process, with arguments against the size of the community, its effect on Georgetown as a family-oriented town, concerns about the costs of providing city utilities, concern about lowered property taxes fixed for retirees under Texas law, and the disproportionate effect of city voting.

Georgetown is considered to be one of the best places to retire in the nation because of its fairly warm climate year round, close proximity to both the countryside and Austin, excellent medical care including Alzheimer's care, and its increasing population of retirees. In 2007, Georgetown was named by Retirement Places Rated (seventh edition) as the Best Place in America to Retire. Part of this is because Sun City Texas, a large master-planned community for "active adults 55 and over", calls Georgetown home. Twenty-five years after the project groundbreaking, Sun City is now home to nearly 16,000 residents and has been a driving force behind growth, development, and the very shape of Georgetown since its inception.

Numerous other active adult communities are also found in Georgetown, including the well-respected Wesleyan at Estrella, the Oaks at Wildwood, Heritage Oaks, and many others. Various projects offer differing levels of care, including assisted living. The city, county, and churches also maintain compassionate-care facilities for the elderly at the Bluebonnet Community Residence.

Energy policy
Georgetown is the first Texas city to operate entirely on renewable energy.  Georgetown's projected power expenditures were $33 million for 2016 (spent $40 million); $39 million for 2017 (spent $46 million) and $45 million for 2018 (spent $53 million). It made up the shortfall through lower capital investments, rate adjustments, and "higher revenue" (tax).  The average home power bill in the city increased 22% in 2019 compared to 2018.

Government and politics

City government
The City of Georgetown is a home rule city and adopted its initial home-rule charter on April 24, 1970. As provided by its charter, Georgetown has a council-manager form of government. Under this form of government, the city council provides leadership by establishing the city's goals and policies. The city council appoints a full-time city manager to achieve the desired end set by the city council. The manager oversees the day-to-day activities of the city and all city departments and executes council-established laws and policies. The city council is composed of seven council members elected by geographic districts:

District 1 – Amanda Parr
District 2 – Shawn Hood
District 3 – Michael Triggs
District 4 – Steve Fought 
District 5 – Kevin Pitts
District 6 – Jake French
District 7 – Tommy Gonzalez

A mayor is elected at-large. Each position is elected for a term of three years, with council districts with staggered election dates. Josh Schroeder was elected mayor in 2020 with 64.54% of the vote and will serve until May 2023. David Morgan was hired by the City Council as the City Manager in 2015.

State and national representation
 Texas House of Representatives:
 State Representative District 20 – Terry Wilson (R) – elected November 2012
 State Representative District 52 – James Talarico (D) – elected November 2018
 Texas Senate
 Texas Senate District 5 – Charles Schwertner (R) – elected November 2012
 United States House of Representatives:
 Texas's 31st congressional district – John R. Carter (R)

Education

The City of Georgetown is served by the Georgetown Independent School District and Georgetown High School, a National Blue Ribbon Award school, serves the community. Georgetown opened a second high school, East View High, in 2008. The graduating class of 2014 was the first class of students to graduate from East View as a full high school. Up to that point, East View High School had started as a freshman-only campus and added on one grade at a time as those students moved up.

Georgetown is also the home of Southwestern University, a private, four-year, undergraduate, liberal arts college. Founded in 1875, Southwestern is the oldest university in Texas. The school is affiliated with the United Methodist Church, although the curriculum is nonsectarian. Southwestern offers 40 bachelor's degrees in the arts, sciences, fine arts, and music, as well as interdisciplinary and pre-professional programs. The university is accredited by the Southern Association of Colleges and Schools and the National Association of Schools of Music.

Sites of interest

 Williamson County Courthouse
 Williamson County Art Guild
 Berry Springs Park
 Sun City Texas
 Blue Hole Park
 San Gabriel Park
 Georgetown Firefighters Museum
 Inner Space Cavern
 Lake Georgetown
 Georgetown Municipal Airport
 The Levy House
 Palace Theatre
 Georgetown Art Center
 Garey Park

Movies filmed in Georgetown
List partly from material provided by the Texas Film Commission
 Friday Night Lights (Movie & TV series)
 Leadbelly
 Grindhouse
 Bernie
 My Boyfriend's Back
 Natural Selection
 The Big Picture
 Picnic
 Über Goober
 Pair of Aces
 What's Eating Gilbert Grape
 Night Job
 Johnny Be Good
 Michael – a 1996 Nora Ephron film
 Varsity Blues
 Lemmy Lemmy
 Where the Heart Is
 Shady Grove
 The Prophet of Armageddon
 Dazed and Confused
 Hope Floats
 Temple Grandin
 Men, Women & Children

Notable people
 Brian Anderson, sports announcer: Turner Sports, Milwaukee Brewers
 Mason Crosby, NFL kicker, Green Bay Packers, 2010 Super Bowl XLV champion
 Matt Dominguez, a Grey Cup winner and 2006 All-Star wide receiver with the Saskatchewan Roughriders of the Canadian Football League
 Thomas Fletcher, NFL Long Snapper, Carolina Panthers
 Conan Gray, singer-songwriter, internet personality, awarded 'Best YouTube Musician' at the 2019 Shorty Award
 Ryan Ludwick, a Major League Baseball outfielder who last played for the Cincinnati Reds
 Nolan Ryan, former Major League Baseball player
 Granger Smith, singer-songwriter, Country Music, 2016 BMI Awards won the BMI Country Award, 2017 IHeartRadio Music Awards nominated for Best New Country Artist
 James Willbanks, military historian

Notes

References

External links

 City of Georgetown website
 Red Poppy Festival

 
Cities in Texas
Cities in Williamson County, Texas
County seats in Texas
Greater Austin
Populated places established in 1848